Pamilya Roces (International title: Family Jewels / ) is a 2018 Philippine television drama series broadcast by GMA Network. Directed by Joel Lamangan, it stars Carla Abellana, Gabbi Garcia, Sophie Albert, Shaira Diaz and Jasmine Curtis-Smith. It premiered on October 8, 2018 on the network's Telebabad line up replacing Inday Will Always Love You. The series concluded on December 14, 2018 with a total of 50 episodes.

The series is streaming online on YouTube.

Premise
Roces family have wealth and power. They are the owners of the biggest jewelry business in the country. While the patriarch has three families and when he suffers from a heart attack, his families rush to his side. The lives of three women and five sisters get complicated as their lives intertwined.

Cast and characters

Lead cast
 Carla Abellana as Crystal Rose Austria Roces-Javellana
 Gabbi Garcia as Jade Austria Roces
 Sophie Albert as Amber Bolocboc Roces-Gomez
 Shaira Diaz  as Amethyst "Amy" Renacia Roces
 Jasmine Curtis-Smith as Pearl Renacia Quirante

Supporting cast
 Roi Vinzon as Rodolfo "Rod" Gardamonte Roces
 Gloria Diaz as Natalia Austria-Roces
 Snooky Serna as Camilla Vera-Austria
 Elizabeth Oropesa as Violeta "Violet/Violy" Bolocboc
 Rocco Nacino as Hugoberto "Hugo" Ponciano Javellana
 Andre Paras as Gareth Austria
 Christian Bautista as Ralph Gomez
 Mika dela Cruz as Donnatella "Donna" Rosales
 Manolo Pedrosa as Hilario "Gil" Figueroa

Recurring cast
 Jim Pebanco as Val
 Arianne Bautista as Kate
 Julia Lee as Stella
 Frances Makil-Ignacio as Marilou "Lulu" Lucero
 Katrina Halili as Maria Eloisa "Maisa" Renacia Quirante / Maisa Sampaguita
 William Lorenzo as Virgil Quirante / Vermont

Guest cast
 Ana Roces as Lily Renacia
 Mike Tan as young Rodolfo
 Tony Mabesa as Manolo
 Jules dela Paz as Yves
 Angel Guardian as Zara
 Jana Trias as Betsy
 Renerich Ocon as Elvie
 Allysa del Real as Tiffany / Tiff
 Michael Angelo Lobrin as Winston Go
 Leonora Caño as Diane
 Nicole Donesa as Bebe
 Kristof Garcia as Tristan
 Jon Romano as Lando Macaraeg
 Karlo Duterte as Gordon

Production
Teresita Marquez was cast to portray Amber Roces, and later backed out during pre-production due to the show's "sensitive" scenes. Sophie Albert was hired as her replacement.

Ratings
According to AGB Nielsen Philippines' Nationwide Urban Television Audience Measurement People in television homes, the pilot episode of Pamilya Roces earned a 7.4% rating.

References

External links
 
 

2018 Philippine television series debuts
2018 Philippine television series endings
Philippine comedy-drama television series
Filipino-language television shows
GMA Network drama series
Television shows set in the Philippines